James Elton "Jim" West (March 28, 1951 – July 22, 2006) was an American politician from Spokane, Washington. While Mayor of Spokane in 2005, he was the target of allegations of the sexual abuse of boys twenty years earlier. These allegations became public after West became a target of a sting operation conducted by his hometown newspaper, The Spokesman-Review. Some journalists and academics criticized the paper for what they saw as a form of entrapment. West admitted engaging in homosexual behavior with adults, despite an earlier record of supporting "anti-gay" legislation. Though never charged, he was removed from office by recall in 2005. The Federal Bureau of Investigation (FBI) eventually closed its investigation and took no action for lack of evidence.

Early years
Born in Salem, Oregon, West was raised in Spokane and graduated from Lewis and Clark High School in 1969. He attended the University of Nevada in Reno, joined ROTC, then served in the U.S. Army as a paratrooper with the 82nd Airborne Division. Honorably discharged in late 1974, West returned to Spokane to pursue a career in law enforcement, with the Medical Lake police department and later as a deputy sheriff for Spokane County. He concurrently attended Spokane Community College and graduated from Gonzaga University with a degree in criminal justice in 1978.

Legislative career
After a failed bid for sheriff in 1978, West was elected to the Spokane city council in 1980. In 1982, he was elected to the state legislature as a Republican representing the 6th legislative district in the house. West was elected to the state senate in 1986, serving until his resignation to become Mayor of Spokane in 2003.  In the senate, he chaired several powerful committees (health, ways and means) and was majority leader.

During his years in the legislature, West developed a record as an opponent of homosexual rights. He supported several "anti-gay" bills, including one that would have banned gays and lesbians from working in schools and day care centers. He unsuccessfully proposed a law banning all sexual activity among unmarried persons under the age of 18. In 1995, when West was a state senator, he advocated the impeachment of Gov. Mike Lowry for alleged sexual harassment.

He served as Mayor of Spokane from 2003 to 2005.

Investigation

In June 2003, under editor Steven A. Smith, The Spokesman-Review, Spokane's only daily newspaper, began a series of investigative reports into a series of sexual abuse incidents that had occurred in Spokane during the 1970s and 1980s, but went unreported at the time. Reporter Bill Morlin worked on the story for more than a year but failed to find a link between West and the crimes committed by his friend David D. Hahn twenty years earlier.

The newspaper nevertheless targeted West in a sting operation. In 2004, reporter Morlin received a tip about West from a source that has never been publicly identified. The source claimed that the real identity of the persona on the gay.com website named "Cobra82" was in fact Mayor West. The Spokesman-Review then hired a professional investigator to create a false online persona on Gay.com named "Motobrock." This tactic was then used by the newspaper to arrange a meeting between the two. When Jim West turned up for the meeting on a Spokane golf course the newspaper editor was also present and correctly concluded that Cobra82 was the mayor.

In 2005, sex-abuse charges against West surfaced in The Spokesman-Review. Robert J. Galliher claimed that West had committed sexual abuse against him while a member of West's Boy Scout troop. These charges about events two decades old could not be confirmed by other witnesses and Galliher's long criminal record tended to discredit him as well. West called the molestation allegations "flat lies," but admitted to having private online relationships in the past year through the Gay.com website. It was alleged that he offered unpaid internships to young gay men, none under the age of 18, though some were just graduating from high school. West denied charges that he had sought out minors.

Calls for his resignation spread. West defended himself on the Today Show on May 30, 2005. He explained his support for laws unfavorable to gays in this way: "If someone hires you to paint their house red, then you paint it red. Even if you think it would look better green." In a Spokane City Council meeting immediately afterward, a resolution requesting that he step down passed unanimously (7–0), yet West announced he intended to continue on as Mayor.

On June 2, the Spokane County Republican Party, Washington State Republican Party, and Spokane County Democratic Chairwoman Katie Kirking called for West's resignation. The FBI conducted its own investigation and a special city commission was set up to investigate and determine if any laws or policies had been broken In early August, 2005, the FBI searched West's home and seized his personal computers as part of its public corruption investigation.

Organizers of a recall gathered a sufficient number of signatures, and a special mail-in election was held on December 6, 2005, to determine whether West would remain in office. West was recalled by the voters with 65% in favor of ousting him to 35% in favor of keeping him as mayor. His term ended on December 16, 2005, the day the final votes were certified by the Spokane County Auditor's office. West's ouster marked the first time in the history of Spokane that a sitting mayor was recalled out of office.

On February 16, 2006, the Federal Bureau of Investigation issued its report closing its investigation of West. In the FBI report, Attorney Mark Bartlett said, "We did not find facts that would justify initiating federal criminal charges."

Personal life

Jim West proposed to Ginger Marshall from the Floor of the Washington State Senate.  They were married for five years.

Ginger Marshall said this about Jim West: "He cared about Spokane. He cared about the people. He cared about the infrastructure, that Spokane be and continue to be a vibrant city. He always wanted more for Spokane. He served Spokane from the time he graduated from college. He started his career as a deputy sheriff and was a City Council member. Was a member of the House of Representatives and then the State Senate. He had ambitions to do good things for Spokane, and it grew into ambitions for doing good work for the state as a whole."

Later years

In the final days of his life, West was mulling over another opportunity to run for office. He also told KREM 2 in his last TV interview that during his tenure in the state legislature he only regretted one vote, for a bill that would have banned gays from working in schools and day-care centers.

West was diagnosed with colon cancer in 2003. By the early fall of 2005 West's isolation from the Spokane community was nearly complete. He had only a few friends and family to turn to for support during his illness. He joined the conservative Bethel African Methodist Episcopal Church of Spokane led by Pastor Lonnie Mitchell. He received support there and attended services regularly until his death from complications from cancer on July 22, 2006.

Election results

List of votes from all of West's elections.

References

External links
 Spokesman-Review full investigative report
 Today Show
 Even the mayor wonders: Who is the real Jim West? (Seattle Times)
 PBS Frontline report A Hidden Life (November 2006)

1951 births
2006 deaths
American LGBT military personnel
Deaths from cancer in Washington (state)
Deaths from colorectal cancer
Gay politicians
Gonzaga University alumni
LGBT Methodists
LGBT mayors of places in the United States
LGBT state legislators in Washington (state)
Mayors of Spokane, Washington
Republican Party Washington (state) state senators
Republican Party members of the Washington House of Representatives
Recalled American mayors
United States Army soldiers
20th-century American politicians